Arkadiusz Krystian Milik (born 28 February 1994) is a Polish professional footballer who plays as a striker for Serie A club Juventus, on loan from Ligue 1 club Marseille, and the Poland national team.

Milik began his career as a footballer in the Rozwój Katowice youth squad. In 2011, he signed a one-year contract with Górnik Zabrze, and in 2012 he transferred to Bayer Leverkusen and later played on loan for FC Augsburg and Ajax respectively. In 2015–16, he was purchased by Ajax on a four-year deal for a reported €2.8 million fee. While playing for Ajax, Milik became one of the top goalscorers in Eredivisie. On 1 August 2016, he joined Italian club Napoli for €35 million, effectively replacing Gonzalo Higuaín. On 21 January 2021, he joined French club Marseille on loan from Napoli.

At international level, Milik participated at UEFA Euro 2016 with Poland and reached the quarter-final stage of the tournament. He also took part at the 2018 FIFA World Cup, where his team was eliminated in the group stage, and the 2022 World Cup, where his team advanced to the Round of 16.

Early life
Sławomir "Moki" Mogilan, a football coach, recognized Milik's footballing talent and helped develop his abilities, fostering a greater professionalism in his outlook. When he was 16 years old, reports of the talented youngster had reached England and he was invited to trial with Tottenham Hotspur and Reading, but ultimately decided to focus on his football in Poland.

Club career

Rozwój Katowice
Milik began his career as a youth player for Rozwój Katowice and played in the reserve team during the 2009–10 season. On 23 October 2010, the 16-year-old made his III liga debut when he scored two goals in a 4–0 victory over KS Krasiejów. In November, he went on trial at Górnik Zabrze, where he scored one goal in two appearances for the club's Młoda Ekstraklasa team. In winter, he and his teammate Wojciech Król were on trial with Reading, Tottenham Hotspur and Legia Warszawa. Milik ended the season with ten appearances and four goals for Rozwój Katowice.

Górnik Zabrze
Despite offers from other clubs, on 1 July 2011 Milik signed a one-year contract with Górnik Zabrze for a fee of 500,000 zlotys. Milik made his Ekstraklasa debut on 31 July in a 1–1 draw with Śląsk Wrocław; in the 53rd minute, he was substituted by Daniel Gołębiewski.

Bayer Leverkusen
On 17 December 2012, German Bundesliga side Bayer Leverkusen confirmed they had signed Milik on a contract until summer 2018, for a reported transfer fee of €2.6 million. Milik failed to impress at Leverkusen though, making only 6 appearances before being demoted to the Leverkusen reserve team.

Loan to FC Augsburg
On 30 August 2013, FC Augsburg signed Milik on a one-year loan deal. The loan fee was reported to be €150,000, and composed of a base amount that decreased the more games Milik played for Augsburg and increased if Augsburg maintained its Bundesliga status. During his spell in Augsburg, he was capped in 18 matches, but he only scored 2 goals. However, he scored an equalizer in the 88th minute in a 2–2 home draw against Borussia Mönchengladbach, helping Augsburg earn a vital point.

Ajax
On 15 May 2014, it was announced that Milik would spend the 2014–15 season on loan at reigning Dutch champions Ajax, with a purchase option of €2.8 million.

2014–15 season (loan)
On 24 September 2014, Milik played in the first official Amsterdam derby to be contested since 1983 when Ajax took on JOS Watergraafsmeer in the KNVB Cup. Milik earned the man of the match award after scoring six out of the club's nine goals and assisting a further two in the Olympic Stadium. On 10 December 2014, he scored his first Champions League goal in a 4–0 victory over APOEL. On 1 April 2015, Ajax reached an agreement with Bayer Leverkusen to purchase Milik outright on a four-year deal for a reported €2.8 million fee.

2015–16 season

On 26 June 2015, Ajax announced Milik would replace departing striker Kolbeinn Sigþórsson as the club's number 9 for the 2015–16 season, switching from kit number 19. Milik scored his first goal that season in a UEFA Champions League qualifier against Rapid Wien, making the scoreline 1–2. The game was eventually lost 2–3 and the two-legged tie 4–5 on aggregate to Rapid, relegating Ajax to the UEFA Europa League play-off against Czech side Jablonec.

Milik scored his first goal of the 2015–16 Eredivisie season against Willem II after newly appointed captain Davy Klaassen provided him with a cross, which Milik headed-in. Ajax went on to win the game 3–0 after a brace from Anwar El Ghazi. In the first leg of the Europa League play-off qualifier against Jablonec, Milik scored a penalty after Klaassen was fouled in the box; the goal was the winner in a 1–0 match. During the beginning of the season, Milik also scored goals against Willem II, NEC and Excelsior. Nearly a month later, on 31 October, he began a scoring streak again, this time scoring two against Roda JC in a 6–0 rout. Milik also scored league goals against Cambuur on 11 November and Heerenveen on 5 December, the latter in which he also missed a penalty. On 26 November, Milik scored the 1–1 equalizer against Celtic in the Europa League group stage, where Ajax went on to win 2–1 away in Glasgow. On 20 December, Ajax's final match before the winter break, he also scored the opening goal against De Graafschap in an eventual 2–1 home victory at the Amsterdam Arena.

After the winter break, Milik was out of form and got a lot of criticism, having gone scoreless in Ajax's first three Eredivisie matches. He broke his poor run of form by scoring against Roda JC on 31 January 2016 in a 2–2 away draw. On 21 February, against Excelsior, he then scored a brace, while in Ajax's next home game, on 28 February, he scored another two goals against AZ. One week later, on 6 March, Milik scored against Willem II in an eventual 0–4 away win in Tilburg.

Napoli

Milik signed with Napoli on 1 August 2016; his €35 million transfer was officially confirmed by the club the following afternoon. He made his club debut on 27 August, scoring his first two goals for Napoli in a 4–2 home win over Milan in Serie A. He scored braces again against Dynamo Kyiv and Bologna in September, but on 8 October, Milik tore his anterior cruciate ligament in a Polish international fixture against Denmark and was expected to be out for the rest of the season. However, as of 12 February 2017, he resumed playing and was fielded again on 15 February in the Champions League match against Real Madrid.

In September, Milik suffered his second anterior cruciate ligament injury in under 12 months – in his other knee, on this occasion – and was expected to be ruled out for at least four months; in January 2018, he underwent medical tests and was cleared to resume training.

In the 2020 Coppa Italia Final on 17 June, following a 0–0 draw after regulation time, Milik scored the winning spot kick in a 4–2 penalty shoot-out victory against Juventus.

In the 2020–21 season, after having decided not to extend his contract and at the same time rejected a number of transfer options, Milik was excluded from the official Serie A and UEFA Europa League squads.

Loan to Marseille 
On 21 January 2021, Milik joined Ligue 1 club Olympique de Marseille on an 18-month loan deal with an obligation to buy. He made his debut in a 3–1 loss against Monaco on 23 January. On 17 October 2021, he scored his 10th goal for Marseille in his 17th appearance in a 4–1 win against Lorient becoming the most efficient goalscorer for the club since Sonny Anderson in the 1993–94 season. On 19 December 2021, he scored a hat-trick against Cannet Rocheville in a 4–1 Marseille win, helping his club advance to the round of 16 in the Coupe de France. On 31 January, he scored another goal for the club in a 1:1 draw against Montpellier HSC helping Marseille to advance to the quarerfinals of the Coupe de France after a penalty shootout (5:4). On 4 February, he scored a hat-trick in a 5:2 victory against Angers SCO. On 17 February, he scored two goals for Marseille in a Europa Conference League match against Qarabağ FK. By achieving this, he became the second Marseille player in the 21st century to score at least six goals in UEFA competitions after Didier Drogba who scored 11 goals during the 2003–04 UEFA Cup.

Loan to Juventus 
On 26 August 2022, Juventus announced the signing of Milik on loan from Marseille for the 2022–23 season.

International career

On 13 April 2011, Milik scored a goal for Poland under-17 side in a 4–1 victory over England Schools U18. On 15 July 2011, he was called up to the under-19 team.

On 12 October 2012, Milik made his debut for the Polish senior team against South Africa. On 14 December, he scored his first goal for the national side in the 4–1 friendly victory over Macedonia.

Milik scored nine times for Poland under-21s during qualification for the 2015 UEFA European Under-21 Championship, including back-to-back hat-tricks against Malta and Greece in November 2013.

UEFA Euro 2016
On 11 October 2014, Milik scored the opening goal in a 2–0 win over world champions Germany in a 2016 UEFA Euro qualifying match. This was Poland's first win over Germany, who had not lost in 19 competitive games and 33 previous qualifiers. Milik formed a successful strike partnership with Robert Lewandowski during qualification for the European Championships, with additional goals coming in a 2–2 draw with Scotland, a 4–0 win away to Georgia and another 4–0 defeat of the same opposition at the National Stadium in Warsaw.

In Euro 2016, Milik scored for Poland in their opening game, beating Northern Ireland 1–0. He also netted his attempt in his nation's penalty shootout exit to eventual champions Portugal in the quarter-finals.

2018 FIFA World Cup
Milik appeared in the 2018 FIFA World Cup in Russia. His nation was defeated 2–1 in their opening match against Senegal, and then lost 3–0 in their second group match against Colombia. Poland managed a 1–0 win over Japan in their final group match, but were eliminated in the first round.

Style of play
Usually deployed as an out-and-out striker, Milik is a versatile and well-rounded left-footed forward who is also capable of playing off another forward as a second striker or as a winger, due to his ability to both score and create goals. He possesses pace and good movement off the ball, as well as a powerful and accurate shot, which make him an excellent finisher and goalscorer; he is also physically strong, agile, and a good header of the ball, which allows him to excel in the air. His playing style has been compared to that of his compatriot Robert Lewandowski in the Polish sports media. Regarded as a promising young striker in his youth, in 2012, Don Balón named him one of the 101 most promising young players in the world born after 1991.

Personal life
In 2013, Milik began dating Polish model Jessica Ziółek. 

Milik features on the cover of the Polish version of FIFA 16 alongside global cover star Lionel Messi.

Milik is a devoted fan of Manchester United. Milik says he "dreams of playing for Manchester United" but insists he's "far from it".

Milik's childhood football hero is Cristiano Ronaldo; in an interview during Euro 2016, he said he followed Ronaldo closely and had been inspired by the Portuguese striker.

Career statistics

Club

International

Scores and results list Poland's goal tally first, score column indicates score after each Milik goal.

Honours
Napoli
Coppa Italia: 2019–20

Individual
Polish Newcomer of the Year: 2012
KNVB Cup top goalscorer: 2014–15 (8 goals)

References

External links

 Arkadiusz Milik at Voetbal International 
 
 
 

1994 births
Living people
People from Tychy
Polish footballers
Poland international footballers
Polish expatriate footballers
Association football forwards
Górnik Zabrze players
Bayer 04 Leverkusen players
FC Augsburg players
AFC Ajax players
S.S.C. Napoli players
Olympique de Marseille players
Bundesliga players
Ekstraklasa players
Eredivisie players
Eerste Divisie players
Serie A players
Ligue 1 players
Expatriate footballers in France
Expatriate footballers in Germany
Expatriate footballers in Italy
Expatriate footballers in the Netherlands
Sportspeople from Silesian Voivodeship
Polish expatriate sportspeople in France
Polish expatriate sportspeople in Germany
Polish expatriate sportspeople in Italy
Polish expatriate sportspeople in the Netherlands
UEFA Euro 2016 players
2018 FIFA World Cup players
2022 FIFA World Cup players